is a railway station in the city of Kitanagoya, Aichi Prefecture,  Japan, operated by Meitetsu.

Lines

Station layout
The station has two island platforms with the elevated station building above and at a right angle to the tracks and platform. The station has automated ticket machines, Manaca automated turnstiles and is unattended.

Platforms

Adjacent stations

|-
!colspan=5|Nagoya Railroad

Station history
Nishiharu Station was opened on August 6, 1912.  The station was reconstructed in March 1993 from dual opposed side platforms to its current configuration, and a new station building was completed.

Passenger statistics
In fiscal 2013, the station was used by an average of 22,288 passengers daily.

Surrounding area
 PareMarche Nishiharu
 ruins of Kunotsubo Castle

See also
 List of Railway Stations in Japan

References

External links

 Official web page 

Railway stations in Japan opened in 1912
Railway stations in Aichi Prefecture
Stations of Nagoya Railroad